Sult, SULT, or SULTs may refer to:

 Sult (novel) or Hunger, an 1890 novel by Knut Hamsun
 Sult (film) or Hunger, a 1966 adaptation of Hamsun's novel, directed by Henning Carlsen
 Sult, Albania, a village in the Gramsh municipality, Elbasan County, central Albania
Sulfotransferase, enzymes that catalyze the transfer of a sulfo group

See also 
 Salt (disambiguation)
 Jean-de-Dieu Soult (1769-1851), French general and statesman